Bohler Gymnasium is a 3,000 seat multi-purpose arena on the campus of Washington State University in Pullman, Washington.  Opened  in 1928 and located directly northwest of Rogers Field (now the site of Martin Stadium), it was home to the Cougar basketball teams through March 1973, as the new Beasley Coliseum opened that June. A power outage at Beasley in January 1987 forced it back into service for a conference game against Arizona.

Named after longtime head coach and athletic director Fred Bohler (1885–1960) in October 1946, it was refurbished in 2000 and is currently the home venue of Cougar volleyball. The only volleyball specific venue in the Pac-12. 

When the gym hosted the Pacific Coast Conference championship series in March 1941, its capacity was 5,600; it was estimated at 5,000 in the

References

External links
WSU Athletics: Bohler Gym
Washington State University – Bohler Gymnasium history

Indoor arenas in Washington (state)
Defunct college basketball venues in the United States
Sports venues in Washington (state)
Buildings and structures in Pullman, Washington
Washington State Cougars men's basketball